Jamal Charles may refer to:

 Jamaal Charles (born 1986), American football running back
 Jamal Charles (footballer) (born 1995), Grenadian footballer